Colley is an unincorporated community in Dickenson County, Virginia, in the United States.

History
Colley was named for the Colley family of pioneer settlers.

References

Unincorporated communities in Dickenson County, Virginia
Unincorporated communities in Virginia